Henry Carey, 2nd Earl of Monmouth, KB (15 January 1596 – 13 June 1661) was an English nobleman and translator.

Life
He was born in Denham, Buckinghamshire, to Robert Carey, 1st Earl of Monmouth, and Elizabeth Trevannion. 
He appears to have spent his childhood at the various places of residence which his father occupied from time to time on the borders, but after the death of Queen Elizabeth he lived in the atmosphere of the court. He entered as a fellow commoner at Exeter College, Oxford, during Lent term 1611, and took the B.A. degree in February 1613.

He spent the next three years in travelling on the continent and in acquiring that knowledge of foreign languages for which he became afterwards so distinguished. Returning to England during the autumn of 1616 he was one of twenty-six personages—and the only one of the number whose father was not a nobleman—who were made knights of the Bath in November of that year on the occasion of Charles being created prince of Wales. 
He showed no inclination for the life of a courtier, and his parents busied themselves during the next year or two in making for their son some advantageous alliance. 
After feebly objecting to more than one of the proposals, he was at last married in 1620 to Martha, eldest daughter of Lionel Cranfield, 1st Earl of Middlesex, who eventually became Lord High Treasurer of England.

From this time he seems to have lived in retirement among his books in the country. 
His father's death in 1639 and his consequent succession to the earldom made little change in his habits. 
Only once does he appear to have come forward to take part in the conflicts of the turbulent times, when he spoke in the House of Lords in June 1641 on the bill for depriving the bishops of their seats in parliament. 
When Charles I issued the famous declaration and profession in June 1642, Monmouth's name appears among the signatures, but from this time he retired from all political life, and henceforth till his death he was busily engaged in translating various works from the Italian and French, and letting the world go by him as if he had no interest in its concerns. 
The truth is that he had inherited none of the immense physical vigour and energy of his father and grandfather, and if he had any ambition there is no evidence to show that his abilities were at all more than respectable. 
Horace Walpole's judgement upon him is probably correct: 

He was created a Knight of the Bath in 1616 and served four terms as a member of parliament, representing Camelford, Beverley, Tregony and St Mawes between 1621 and 1626. He succeeded to his father's earldom in 1639.

His titles became extinct upon his death in Rickmansworth, Hertfordshire on 13 June 1661.

Translated Works
Carey translated Virgilio Malvezzi's Romulus and Tarquin from the original Italian in 1637, and Giovanni Biondi's An History of the Civill Warres of England.. in 1641, also from the Italian. The Complete History of the Wars of Flanders, by Cardinal Guido Bentivoglio, followed in 1654. In 1658, Monmouth translated Paolo Paruta's Istoria Veneziana (The History of Venice) from Italian into English, the text was subsequently published in London in the same year. His last translation, Gualdo Priorato's The History of France, remained unfinished at Monmouth's death, and was completed in 1676 by William Brent.

Children

Henry married Martha Cranfield, daughter of Lionel Cranfield, 1st Earl of Middlesex and Elizabeth Shepard. Henry and Martha had ten children.
Lionel Carey (born about 1622). Killed at the Battle of Marston Moor on 2 July 1644 while fighting for the Royalists. 
Henry Carey (1623 – 5 November 1649) married Lady Mary Scrope
Lady Anne Carey (c. 1626 – 15 January 1688/89) married (1) James Hamilton (2) Robert Maxwell
Lady Philadelphia Carey (born c. 1628 – died before June 1661)
Lady Elizabeth Carey (born c. 1630 – 14 December 1676)
Lady Mary Carey (born c. 1632 – died after 1682) married William Feilding, 3rd Earl of Denbigh
Lady Trevaniana Carey (born c. 1634 – died before June 1661)
Lady Martha Carey (born c. 1635 – 23 January 1705) married John Middleton
Lady Theophila Carey (born c. 1637 – died before June 1661)
Lady Magdalena Carey (born c. 1639 – died before June 1661)

References

Attribution

Sources

thepeerage.com. Retrieved 21 March 2008
Doyle, James William Edmund. The Official Baronage of England, Showing the Succession, Dignities, and Offices of Every Peer from 1066 to 1885, with Sixteen Hundred Illustrations. (p. 507) London: Longmans, Green, 1886.googlebooks. Retrieved 21 March 2008
familysearch.org. Retrieved 21 March 2008
  

1596 births
1661 deaths
Knights of the Bath
Members of the pre-1707 English Parliament for constituencies in Cornwall
Henry
English MPs 1621–1622
English MPs 1624–1625
English MPs 1625
English MPs 1626
English translators
French–English translators
Italian–English translators
Alumni of Exeter College, Oxford
People from Denham, Buckinghamshire
Earls of Monmouth